Cita Potokar (28 November 1915 – 28 November 1993) was a Slovene painter also known for her illustrations of children's books. Many of her best known works draw from her experience as an internee during the Second World War as a result of her activities in the Slovene Liberation Front.

She won the Levstik Award for her illustrations of Branka Jurca's book Lizike za vse (Lollipops for All).

Selected illustrated works

 Kaj nam je popisal Jakec (What Little Jack Told Us), written by Jože Šmit, 1953
 Vesela abeceda (Happy Alphabet), written by Vera Albreht, 1955
 Bratec in sestrica (Brother and sister), written by Branka Jurca, 1956
 Okoli in okoli (Round and Round), written by Branka Jurca, 1960
 Veliki in mali ljudje (Large and Small People), written by Zofka Kveder, 1960
 Lizike za vse (Lollipops for All), written by Branka Jurca, 1965
 Sto belokranjskih (A Hundred from White Carniola), written by Lojze Zupanc, 1965
 Marjanka Vseznalka (Marjanka Knowitall), written by Branka Jurca, 1966

References

Slovenian illustrators
Slovenian women illustrators
Slovenian children's book illustrators
1915 births
1993 deaths
Levstik Award laureates
Slovenian women artists
20th-century Slovenian painters
20th-century women artists
Artists from Ljubljana